The Ministry of Finance (MOF) is the governmental body in the Sultanate of Oman responsible for all government financial matters.

The current Finance Minister is Sultan bin Salem bin Saeed al-Habsi.

History 
The first financial agency was established in January 1941, and the financial affairs were managed by Sultan of Oman. The name of the ministry of changed from the Ministry of Finance and Economy to the Ministry of Finance in the year 1995.

Ministers
Secretaries of financial affairs 
Cornelius James Pelly, 1968 - 1970
Philip Aldous, 1970 - 1972

Sultan of Oman was nominally the Minister of Finance from January 1972 until August 2020. There was a minister responsible for financial affairs. 
Abd al Hafiz Salem Rajab, January 1972 - 1973 - ?
Qais Al-Zawawi, 1982 - September 1995
Ahmed bin Abdul Nabi al Makki, 1995 - March 2011
Darwish bin Ismail al-Balushi, March 2011 - August 2020

Minister of Finance 
Sultan bin Salem bin Saeed al-Habsi, August 2020 -

References

External links 
 Ministry of Finance

Government of Oman
Oman
1940s establishments in Oman